Vanessa carye, the western painted lady, is a butterfly of the family Nymphalidae. It is found in South America, from the mountains of Colombia and west of Caracas (Venezuela) through Ecuador, Peru, Bolivia, Chile, southern Brazil, and Paraguay to Patagonia in Argentina. It is also found on Easter Island and Tuamotus.

The larvae feed on Achyrocline flaccida and many other species.

See also
Cynthia (butterfly)
Vanessa annabella

References

carye
Butterflies described in 1812
Fauna of Brazil
Nymphalidae of South America
Taxa named by Jacob Hübner